Duncan McArthur (1772April 29, 1839) was a military officer and a Federalist and National Republican politician from Ohio. He served as the 11th governor of Ohio.

When first elected to state office as a representative, he was serving in the state militia during the War of 1812. He was later appointed as brigadier general in the U.S. Army. Shortly thereafter he was placed in charge of the Army of the Northwest, serving through 1817 and negotiating the Treaty of Fort Meigs of 1817 to ratify peace and land cessions with Native American tribes.

Biography
Sources vary as to McArthur's exact birthdate. It has been given as January 14, 1772 or June 14, 1772. He was born to Scottish immigrants in Dutchess County in the Province of New York, McArthur grew up in western Pennsylvania and later moved to Kentucky, where he was employed as an Indian ranger.

McArthur and his friend Alexander McGuffey volunteered in 1790 at Fort Pitt for expeditions against Native Americans during the Northwest Indian War, serving as a scout under Generals Josiah Harmar and Anthony Wayne.   McArthur obtained a position with Nathaniel Massie in 1793, and worked with Massie on a surveying expedition in the Northwest Territory. In 1796, he worked with Massie to lay out the new town of Chillicothe, Ohio, which was to become the state capital in 1803. McArthur moved across the Ohio River in 1797 to  Chillicothe, where he gained wealth by his land speculations in the Northwest Territory.

Career in the War of 1812
McArthur was elected to the United States House of Representatives from Ohio's 3rd congressional district while serving in the state militia during the War of 1812. He never qualified for office as he preferred to continue serving in the military.

Using deception in the First American Invasion of Canada
He was appointed colonel of Ohio volunteers and was second-in-command to General William Hull at Fort Detroit. In July 1812, General William Hull was at Fort Detroit as the British fortified a defensive position across the Detroit River in Windsor, Ontario. Hull decided to move the British to Fort Malden, further away from Detroit, so that he could seize the defenses in Windsor. To implement his plan, Hull resorted to deception, which began when his troops collected all the boats and canoes they could find. On 11 July 1812, Hull sent some boats down the river to Springwells, south of Detroit, in full view of the British. At the same time, the American regiment commanded by Duncan McArthur marched from Detroit to Springwells, also observed by the British.

With the British now anticipating an American crossing south of Detroit, a second American force moved north in the dark until they reached Bloody Run, a crossing point a mile and a half north of Fort Detroit and opposite the Ontario town of Sandwich. Finding no activity at Springwells, the British believed the Americans had already crossed the river and marched on Fort Malden. Assuming Fort Malden was vulnerable, the British troops in Sandwich marched south, and in the morning the Americans at Bloody Run crossed to Sandwich unopposed. After landing in Sandwich, the Americans then marched from Sandwich to Windsor and seized the British defensive works.

Duncan McArthur’s deep penetration raid into Thames
It was July 13, 1812. The American militia and regulars were conducting paramilitary operations in their invasion of Canada. American intelligence claimed they found a group of enemy Indian fighters. American militia commander Duncan McArthur with one hundred American militiamen went in pursuit. The American militia chased the enemy fighters and fell upon their rear. The enemy Indian fighters dispersed into the woods and escaped. Duncan McArthur was about to return, when Captain Smith of the Detroit dragoons overtook him with orders to push forward into enemy territory to the settlements on the Thames in search of provisions. McArthur obeyed and penetrated as far as the Moravian towns, sixty miles from its mouth. There was a house McArthur encountered in his raid in Thames. The owner had fled, but the house was guarded by a file of British soldiers. The group of British soldiers were captured, disarmed, and paroled. McArthur and his militia raiding force seized the boats along the stream and loaded them with enemy supplies they commandeered. On July 17, 1812. McArthur and his militia raiding force returned back to an American base camp with about 200 barrels of flour, 400 blankets, and a quite large quantity of military stores. These were chiefly public property, collected for the British troops at Malden and yet American commander Hull gave a receipt for the whole, public and private.

Engagement at bridge near Fort Malden
On July 19, 1812. American Colonel Duncan McArthur with a recon force combined with 150 Ohio infantry troops under Colonel Lewis Cass are near the bridge leading to Fort Malden. Two British artillery guns fire on the Americans and take out an American cannon. Cass and his fellow Americans capture two British troops after they cross the bridge. All the Americans withdraw with their prisoners safely.

Surrender of Detroit
He and Colonel Lewis Cass were not present at Detroit when Hull surrendered and were greatly angered to hear that Hull had included both of them in the capitulation. When a British officer notified him of the surrender, McArthur is said to have torn off his epaulettes and broke his sword in a fit of rage, although historians note similar stories were told about other officers as well.  The British paroled him and McArthur returned to Ohio.

Enlisting in the U.S. Army
He was appointed a brigadier general in the U.S. Army. Shortly thereafter he was placed in charge of the Army of the Northwest following Harrison's resignation.

Duncan McArthur’s raid

Duncan McArthur conducted a cavalry raid deep into Thames Valley. Duncan’s objective was to devastate the settlement’s food supplies which was mainly flour. Duncan and 700 riflemen mounted on horses conducted their raid on on October. Duncan and his mounted riflemen inflicted massive damage on infrastructure, burned many flour mills, surprised Canadian militia in separate engagements, and took provisions. McArthur’s mounted riflemen raided multiple population centers. McArthur’s raiders killed 18 Canadian militiamen, wounded 9 militiamen, and captured 126 Canadian militia soldiers. McArthur avoided contact with the main British army. After completing his raid, McArthur and his mounted riflemen withdrew back to American lines safely. The American raiders suffered only 1 killed and 6 wounded.

End of War of 1812
McArthur did not face much action any further, but he was engaged in negotiating treaties with the Indians. In 1817, he was one of two commissioners (along with Lewis Cass) who negotiated the Treaty of Fort Meigs, which was signed September 29 of that year with several Native American tribes.

Serving in the House of Representatives
McArthur served intermittently thereafter in the Ohio House of Representatives and Ohio State Senate. He was elected and served a single term from 1823–1825 in the United States House of Representatives before winning election to the governorship in 1830. McArthur served a single term and did not seek re-election.

Death
McArthur was buried in Grandview Cemetery, Chillicothe, Ross County, Ohio, US.  The trust established in his will later became the subject of litigation that went before the U.S. Supreme Court in McArthur v. Scott.

Legacy
The small village of McArthur, Ohio, the seat of Vinton County, is named for him.

McArthur founded the city of Greenfield, Ohio in 1799. Greenfield is located at N39 21.11958 W83 22.96284 (GPS coordinates), about 21 miles due west of Chillicothe. State Route 28, which runs between Greenfield and Chillicothe, in 1973 was named as General Duncan McArthur Highway per act of the 113th Ohio General Assembly.

References

External links

National Governors Association

1772 births
1839 deaths
19th-century American politicians
American militiamen in the War of 1812
American people of the Northwest Indian War
American people of Scottish descent
Burials at Grandview Cemetery (Chillicothe, Ohio)
Democratic-Republican Party members of the United States House of Representatives from Ohio
Governors of Ohio
Members of the Ohio House of Representatives
National Republican Party state governors of the United States
Ohio Federalists
Ohio National Republicans
Ohio state senators
People from Dutchess County, New York
Politicians from Chillicothe, Ohio
Presidents of the Ohio State Senate
Speakers of the Ohio House of Representatives
United States Army generals
United States Army personnel of the War of 1812